Walter Gilbert (1871–1946) was an English sculptor. He first studied at Birmingham Municipal School of Art and then the National Art Training School, now the Royal College of Art. After a short career as an instructor, Gilbert worked at the Bromsgrove Guild, where he was a director, and then at H. H. Martyn. While at the Guild, Gilbert collaborated with Louis Weingartner. When he had moved over to H.H. Martyn, his son, Donald Gilbert, was also employed by the firm, and father and son collaborated on many works. He retired in 1940 and died six years later.

Background

The son of Henry Edward Gilbert and Jane Isabella Gilbert, Walter Gilbert was born on 12 August 1871 in Rugby, Warwickshire.  Gilbert and his wife, Ina MacGeoch, had two children.   Margot and Donald were both encouraged to pursue artistic careers and both assisted their father on the Queen Marys interior decoration in the 1920s.  Donald worked with his father on many commissions.

Education

Gilbert had an educational career that spanned western Europe, India and the United States.   First, and under Benjamin Creswick, Gilbert studied at the Birmingham Municipal School of Art and from 1890 to 1893 at the then National Art Training School.  Having completed his studies at these two schools, Gilbert sought out training around the world: in India, the United States, Belgium, France and Germany.

Career

In 1891 he was drawing master at Rugby School and was then an instructor and headmaster at Bromsgrove School in Worcestershire from 1898 to 1900.  In 1898 he co-founded the Bromsgrove Guild with William Whitehouse and the Birmingham architectural firm, Crouch and Butler. From the early 1900s Gilbert often worked in partnership with Swiss modeller Louis Weingartner on commissions for art metal work.

Their collaborations included, among others:

 Liverpool Cathedral reredos for Giles Gilbert Scott
 Masonic Peace Memorial's Grand Temple gates for architects Winston Newman and H. V. Ashley
 Victoria Memorial and Buckingham Palace gates for Sir Aston Webb

Gilbert was director of the Guild from 1899 until 1918, then he went to H. H. Martyn where until 1940 he was assistant manager. Weingartner ceased working at the Bromsgrove Guild about the same time as Gilbert. Donald Gilbert became a modeller for H.H. Martyn, collaborating on works with his father. Gilbert retired in 1940.

Walter Gilbert participated in many exhibitions including those at the Walker Art Gallery in Liverpool in 1884 and Leeds City Art Gallery in 1902 and 1906. During his lifetime Gilbert also involved himself with garden furnishings and the design of glass.

Later years

On 23 January 1946 at Littlehampton, Sussex, Gilbert died.  St Mary the Virgin, Hanbury, Worcestershire has a memorial that Donald created in memory of his father and Weingartner.

Gallery

Notes

References

Further reading
 Phillip Medhurst, "Walter Gilbert: The Romance in Metalwork”. 

English sculptors
English male sculptors
Modern sculptors
1871 births
1946 deaths
20th-century British sculptors
People from Rugby, Warwickshire